Steve Railsback is an American theatre, film, and television actor. He is best known for his performances in the films The Stunt Man and Lifeforce, and his portrayal of Charles Manson in the 1976 television mini-series Helter Skelter.

Career 
Railsback was a student of Lee Strasberg and the Actors Studio and in the late 1960s and early 1970s spent 10 years working in theatre in New York City. He once said that he found Strasberg extremely difficult to work with.

He made his film debut in The Visitors, directed by Elia Kazan. He portrayed two notorious murderers, appearing as Charles Manson in the 1976 television miniseries Helter Skelter and as Ed Gein in the 2000 film In the Light of the Moon. He also served as executive producer of the latter film.

Other notable roles include the part of Cameron in The Stunt Man with Peter O'Toole, the astronaut Tom Carlsen in Tobe Hooper's Lifeforce, Duane Barry in two episodes of The X-Files, and Joseph Welch in the pilot episode of Supernatural.

In 2008, he appeared in the science fiction/horror movie film Plaguers.

Filmography

Film

Television

References

External links 
 
 
 

Living people
American male film actors
American male television actors
Male actors from Dallas
20th-century American male actors
21st-century American male actors
Year of birth missing (living people)